Tomang is an administrative village in the Grogol Petamburan district of Indonesia. It has postal code of 11440.

See also 
 Grogol Petamburan
 List of administrative villages of Jakarta

West Jakarta
Administrative villages in Jakarta